The Brattstrand Bluffs are rock cliffs on the coast of Antarctica, about  east-north-east of Hovde Island and Amanda Bay. They were first mapped from aerial photographs taken by the Norwegian Lars Christensen Expedition of 1936, and named Brattstranda ("abrupt shore").

References 

Cliffs of Antarctica
Landforms of Princess Elizabeth Land
Ingrid Christensen Coast